Parliamentary elections were held in Norway on 21 October 1918, with a second round between 4 and 11 November. The result was a victory for the Liberal Party, which won 51 of the 123 seats in the Storting. Despite receiving the most votes, the Labour Party won just 18 seats, a loss of one seat compared with the 1915 elections.

Results

References

General elections in Norway
1910s elections in Norway
Norway
Parliamentary
Norway
Norway